The Bartered Bride is a 1960 TV play broadcast by the Australian Broadcasting Corporation. It was an opera directed by Christopher Muir.

References

External links
Clip of production at YouTube

Australian television plays
Australian television plays based on operas
Australian Broadcasting Corporation original programming
English-language television shows
1960 television plays
1960s English-language films